Sey is a surname. Notable people with the name include:

Awa Santesson-Sey (born 1997), Swedish singer
Coby Sey, British musician of Ghanaian heritage
Jennifer Sey (born 1969), American writer, producer and former gymnast
Kwesi Sey, British music producer of Ghanaian heritage
Omar Sey (born 1941), Gambian politician
Seinabo Sey, Swedish pop soul singer of Gambian heritage

See also
Seys, a surname